Ginevra is a feminine given name. It was occasionally used in medieval and Renaissance Italy in reference to Queen Guinevere, King Arthur’s queen in the popular Arthurian legends. It is the Italian version of the name Guinevere, which is a Norman French version of the Welsh name Gwenhwyfar, meaning "white" and "smooth" or "white phantom." It is also associated with the juniper tree  in Italy, where the name for the tree is ginepro. Geneva, Switzerland is called Ginevra in Italian. It is a currently popular name for girls in Italy, where it was among the top 10 most popular names for baby girls in 2020. It is in occasional use in other countries, including the United States, where it was given to 12 newborn girls born in 2020 and to 14 girls born in 2021 and Switzerland, where it was given to 17 girls born in 2020.

People
Ginevra de' Benci (aristocrat) (1457–1521), Italian aristocrat
Ginevra Cantofoli (1618–1672), Italian painter
Ginevra Elkann (born 1979), Italian apprentice film director
Ginevra d'Este (1419–1440), Italian noblewoman
Ginevra King (1898–1980), American socialite and debutante

Fictional characters
Ginevra di Scozia, title character of the opera by Simon Mayr
Princess Ginevra of Scotland, one of the main characters of Handel's opera Ariodante 
Ginevra or Ginny Weasley in Harry Potter books
Ginevra Fanshawe in Charlotte Brontë's novel Villette

Notes

Italian feminine given names